Delroy Slowley is a Jamaican politician from the Labour Party.

Education 
He graduated from Munro College and the University of Technology, Jamaica.

References 

Living people
People educated at Munro College
Members of the House of Representatives of Jamaica
21st-century Jamaican politicians
People from Saint Elizabeth Parish
Jamaica Labour Party politicians
Year of birth missing (living people)
Members of the 14th Parliament of Jamaica